Britain's Best Sitcom was a BBC media campaign in which television viewers were asked to decide the best British situation comedy. Viewers could vote via telephone, SMS, or BBC Online. This first round of voting was conducted in 2003, after which the BBC published a list of the top 100 selections. From this list, they produced a 12-episode television series broadcast by BBC Two from January through to March 2004.

The series was a retrospective that examined the history and qualities of the contending programmes. In the first episode, Jonathan Ross summarised the progress of the poll and presented video clips from the 50 sitcoms that received the most votes. Each of the next ten weekly episodes, one hour in length, focused on one sitcom. In each episode, a different celebrity presenter advocated a particular sitcom, delivering 20 reasons why it deserved viewers' votes. The sitcom's writers and actors, as well as celebrity viewers, also shared their own perspectives and memories. In the 90-minute series finale, transmitted live, Jonathan Ross announced the top sitcom to be Only Fools and Horses, with Blackadder in second place and The Vicar of Dibley in third place.

Notably, all finalists were BBC productions, with ITV and Channel 4 sitcoms not appearing (Father Ted, the highest-ranked non-BBC sitcom, was at number 11).

Episodes

Results

References

Further reading

External links
 Radio Times billings
 

BBC television documentaries
BBC television comedy
2004 in British television
2004 British television series debuts
2004 British television series endings
Top television lists
British television-related lists